Imagine H2O is an international startup accelerator founded in 2008. It is a 501(c)(3) non-profit organization. Imagine H2O provides early stage water startups with mentorship and introductions to investors, strategic partners, and end-users. As a nonprofit, the organization does not take equity in its startups. As of March 2018, Imagine H2O has worked with over 350 water startups. It also works with agriculture technology companies.

Funding

Imagine H2O partners with and is sponsored by a number of foundations and corporations, including Wells Fargo and the California Water Foundation.

Urban Drinking Water Challenge
Imagine H2O has partnered with 11th Hour Racing and Bluewater. to find and deploy innovative technologies aimed at solving the lack of drinking water in urban areas. The challenge closes on July 2, 2018 and has a prize pool of $1,000,000.

See also
 Water Environment Federation
 American Water Works Association
 Business incubator

References

Further reading
National Geographic
Water Tech
Techcrunch
 The Business Journal
Journal-Sentinel
Milwaukee Business Journal
Food Safety Magazine

External links
 
 Imagine H2O Water Entrepreneurs Showcase 2013

Non-profit organizations based in California
Business incubators of the United States
Organizations based in San Francisco
Startup accelerators
Organizations established in 2008